Lewis and Clark Bridge may refer to:

Lewis and Clark Bridge (Wolf Point, Montana), bridge spanning the Missouri River built in 1930
Lewis and Clark Bridge (Columbia River), bridge spanning the Columbia River between Oregon and Washington states
Lewis and Clark Bridge (Ohio River), connecting the eastern part of Louisville, Kentucky to Clark County, Indiana
Lewis and Clark River Bridge, bridge spanning the Lewis and Clark River, in Clatsop County, Oregon
Intercity Viaduct or Lewis and Clark Viaduct,  automobile and pedestrian crossing of the Kansas River in the United States

See also
Lewis and Clark (disambiguation)